Ordinary is a 2012 Indian Malayalam comedy thriller film directed by Sugeeth and written by Nishad K. Koya and Manu Prasad. The film stars Kunchacko Boban, Biju Menon, Asif Ali,and Jishnu Raghavan, . The music was composed by Vidyasagar. The film follows the life of a driver and conductor of a K. S. R. T. C. bus that travels from Pathanamthitta to the village of Gavi via Angamoozhy.

The film was released in India on 17 March 2012, and received positive response from audience. The film was a blockbuster at the box office. The film was remade in Tamil as Jannal Oram by Karu Pazhaniappan and in Telugu as Right Right.

Plot

Iravi Kuttan Pillai,from Thrissur, is appointed in KSRTC as a bus conductor and is assigned Pathanamthitta – Gavi route for his first posting. Gavi is a picturesque small village inside the hilly reserve forest with a small local population, many of whom travels daily to Pathanamthitta for work. Situated near the reservoir of a dam, the village with its tranquillity of life, innocence of people and the beauty of the place charms him and he quickly adapts to his new life. He befriends the locals and falls in love with a native of the village, Kalyani.

Everything goes well for him, until one fateful day, the bus breaks down en route to Gavi. The passengers are provided with alternative transport and servicemen are called in for the repairs. The bus driver Suku,from Palakkad, gets drunk with a friend during the repairs, making him unable to drive. Iravi has to replace him to take the bus back to Gavi, although unauthorized to do so. Dim lighting of the evening, fog and distractions from his conversations with Suku makes him late to see a person standing on road. The brakes are applied too late and the bus presumably hits him. In the panic of the situation and unable to think straight, they send the bleeding victim in a pickup truck that arrived soon after. They lie about the accident and pretends it to be a hit-and-run, while the driver of the truck assures to take him to hospital. One of the bags of the victim gets misplaced and they take it with them.

Guilt-ridden, Iravi along with Suku, search the victim's bag and recognize him to be Devan – the son of Venu master (a retired well-respected school headmaster and Gavi panchayat member ) and the fiancé of Anna, his childhood friend. He works in Surat, Gujarat and is to be married during his current visit. They search for him the next day in the hospitals, but is staggered to know that he is not admitted anywhere. Two days later, the police find his corpse at the bottom of hill, seemingly jumped off of the cliff. Without any other leads, the police believe it to be a suicide, but the two know otherwise. Iravi wishes to confess his part, but is prevented by Suku, as his sister's marriage is near. He assures to do so, immediately after the marriage.

They search for the truck driver, but to no avail. Meanwhile, Anna finds Devan's bag with Iravi through Kalyani, who mistakes the bag to be his. Iravi's grief leads him to confess, taking the blame entirely to himself. He is arrested and the police does not take into consideration the story of the truck driver. Suku is left free of charge as Iravi confessed even to his part. Suku continues with the search and tracks him down. Iravi gets bail and both of them capture him. They learn that the crime was committed by Bhadran – Devan's best friend since childhood.

Bhadran is the local handyman of the village and the shutter operator of the dam's reservoir. During his childhood, his father had committed suicide in the dam, for the grief of his wife eloping with someone. Bhadran had an eccentric odd character – aimless, unrelenting to act as per his wishes, lonely in his ways, but friendly with the village people. The villagers know him as a good fellow with a peculiar attitude. He had loved Anna since childhood, known to none – even to his best friend. He secretly admired her, even when she was engaged to Devan. On his visit, Devan called Bhadran, who came with the truck driver, to take him home. In a fit of rage, Bhadran turned violent to kill Devan, attacking him. But the sight of the bus foiled his plans. The bus, while not hitting him, could not save him as Devan was taken by the truck driver who is unknown to both of them. Bhadran along with the driver kill him, faking it as a suicide. Later, he pretends to be shocked by Devan's death and then turning violent at Iravi while he made his confession.

Being a small village, the news quickly spreads. Bhadran tries to capture Anna and escape with her, but is cornered on top of the dam. He then holds Anna hostage to try to escape. With no way out and rejection from Anna (on learning about the facts), he jumps off the dam and commits suicide. In due course of time, Iravi is shown married to Kalyani, Anna got over Devan and is now married to Jose master. Suku and Iravi are now in different places. The end-credits shows them assigned together on a new common route.

Cast

 Kunchacko Boban as Iravi Kuttan Pillai, the K.S.R.T.C. conductor from Thrissur
 Biju Menon as Suku, the K.S.R.T.C. driver from Palakkad
 Asif Ali as Bhadran, a native of Gavi
 Jishnu Raghavan as Jose Mash, a native of Gavi and a Teacher voice-over by Jisjoy mon
 Ann Augustine as Anna, a native of Gavi
 Shritha Sivadas as Kalyani, Iravi's love interest
 Baburaj as Vakkachan, a frequent passenger of the Gavi-visiting K.S.R.T.C.
 Vaigha Rose as Latha
 Salim Kumar as Ashan, a drunken bus mechanic
 Dharmajan Bolgatty as Anttappan, a friend of Iravi
 Lalu Alex as Venu Mash, a native of Gavi
 Chemban Vinod Jose as Inspector Habeeb Rahman, voice-over by Shobi Thilakan
 Hemanth Menon as Devan, son of Venu Mash
 Kochu Preman as Peethambaran, ex-panchayat president
 Narayanankutty as KSRTC staff
 Joju George as Sebastian
 Raghavan as Priest
 T. P. Madhavan as Bhargavan
 Niyas Backer as E.R. Chandran
 Ambika Mohan as Sharada
 Bindu Murali as Kalyani's mother
 Archana Menon as SexWorker, Shanthi
 Nimisha Suresh as Bus conductress (Guest appearance)
 Sreedevi Unni as Iravi's mother
 Kalamandalam Radhika as Jose's mother
 Baby Sandra
 Sreenivasan as Narrator(Voice-only)
 Prasanth Alexander as Pickup driver

Soundtrack

The soundtrack of the film was composed by Vidyasagar, with all the lyrics written by producer Rajeev Nair. The soundtrack album was released on 4 March 2012 at Gold Souk Mall in Kochi, India.

Reception

Critical reception
IndiaGlitz rated the film 3.25 out of 5 and said "All in all, 'Ordinary' is definitely a watchable flick for the families and the youth, for its freshness and simplicity in storytelling and treatment."

Home videos
In July 2012, the DVD of the movie was released by Movie channel Home Entertainment followed by the Blu-ray release. The satellite rights of the movie was acquired by Surya TV.

Box office
The film was commercial success. The film ran for over 150 days in theatres and grossed a total of ₹20 crore from the box office.

The Times of India stated that the film had become an " extraordinary hit".

Debut
Shritha Sivadas made her movie debut in this film.

References

External links
 

2012 films
2010s Malayalam-language films
Malayalam films remade in other languages
Films scored by Vidyasagar
Indian comedy-drama films
2012 comedy-drama films
Films directed by Sugeeth